Father Paul Guillaume Farges (1844–1912) was a French Catholic missionary, botanist and plant collector, based for much of his life (from 1867) in China, serving at Chongqing from 1892 until his death.

He collected over 4,000 plant specimens, including numerous species new to science, which were sent back to the National Museum of Natural History in Paris, where they were named and described by Adrien Franchet.

His name is commemorated in several plants, including Abies fargesii, Corylus fargesii, Decaisnea fargesii, Salix fargesii, and Torreya fargesii. Most notably, the bamboo genus Fargesia is named for him.

See also 
 Catholic Church in Sichuan

References

19th-century French botanists
Botanists active in China
Roman Catholic missionaries in Sichuan
Roman Catholic missionaries in Tibet
1844 births
1912 deaths
Missionary botanists
20th-century French botanists
Christianity in Chongqing